Luis Alejandro Peña Sanhueza (born June 30, 1979) is a Chilean footballer who played as a midfielder for clubs in Chile and Indonesia.

Career
Peña joined Huachipato youth ranks at the age of sixteen and made his professional debut in a match against Palestino at the age of nineteen thanks to the coach .

After a brief stint with Santiago Morning in 2008, he joined Lota Schwager in the same year. He also played for Deportes La Serena in second half 2008.

In 2010, he moved to Indonesia thanks to a Chilean colleague and joined PSM Makassar. After six months with the club, he switched to Gresik United, where he scored ten goals and became the historical goalscorer for the club at that time. He also played for PSMS Medan and Persib Bandung.

Post-retirement
He has served as coach in the Huachipato youth ranks.

References

External links

 Luis Peña at PlaymakerStats.com
 Luis Peña at FootballDatabase.eu 

1979 births
Living people
People from Arauco Province
Chilean footballers
Chilean expatriate footballers
C.D. Huachipato footballers
Santiago Morning footballers
Lota Schwager footballers
Deportes La Serena footballers
PSM Makassar players
Gresik United players
PSMS Medan players
Persib Bandung players
Chilean Primera División players
Primera B de Chile players
Indonesian Premier Division players
Liga 1 (Indonesia) players
Chilean expatriate sportspeople in Indonesia
Expatriate footballers in Indonesia
Association football midfielders
Chilean football managers